Sir Adrian Edwin White  (born June 1942) is the founder of the British engineering company, Biwater.

In 2015, he was knighted "for services to international trade and development". As of 2017 he is a Deputy Lieutenant of Surrey.

References

1942 births
Living people
British businesspeople
Commanders of the Order of the British Empire
Deputy Lieutenants of Surrey
Knights Bachelor